Love Crazy may refer to:

Love Crazy (1941 film), starring William Powell and Myrna Loy
Love Crazy (1991 film), a Canadian film
Love Crazy (album), by Atlantic Starr